Cameo is an extinct town in Mesa County, in the U.S. state of Colorado. The GNIS classifies it as a populated place.

A post office called Cameo was established in 1907, and remained in operation until 1969.  The community was named for a cameo-like formation near the original town site.

References

Ghost towns in Colorado
Geography of Mesa County, Colorado